John O'Keeffe (20 June 1895 – 25 October 1973) was an Irish hurler who played as a midfielder for the Cork senior team.

O'Keeffe made his first appearance for the team during the 1919 championship and was a regular member of the starting fifteen until his retirement after the 1924 championship. During that time he won one All-Ireland medal and two Munster medals.

At club level O'Keeffe was a one-time county championship medalist with Carrigtwohill.

O'Keeffe's father, Paddy, also played with Cork and won an All-Ireland medal in 1893.  They were the first father and son combination to achieve the distinction of capturing All-Ireland winners' medals.

References

1890s births
1973 deaths
Carrigtwohill hurlers
Cork inter-county hurlers
All-Ireland Senior Hurling Championship winners